Kunnothuparamba is a Grama Panchayat in Kannur district of Kerala state, India that has administration over Kolavelloor census town and Puthoor village.

Demographics
As of the 2011 India census, Kunnothuparamba Grama Panchayat had population of 39,392, among which 19,575 people resided in rural areas and 19,817 in urban areas, of whom 46.1% were male and 53.9% were female. There were 8,596 families, with 4,224 living in rural areas and 4,372 in urban areas. 12% of its population was under 6 years of age. It had average literacy rate of 94.8%, higher than the state average of 94%.

References

Villages near Kuthuparamba
Villages in Kannur district